Halldor Marno Frederickson (April 6, 1906 – April 28, 1992) was a Canadian curler. He was the lead of the 1934 Brier Champion team (skipped by Leo Johnson), representing Manitoba.

References

Brier champions
1906 births
1992 deaths
Curlers from Winnipeg
Canadian people of Icelandic descent
Canadian male curlers